Jennifer Cook was the Chief Executive Officer at GRAIL (company) until June 2019 and was formerly the head of clinical operations at Roche. She started in early-stage research at Genentech and held key positions including leading a U.S. commercial business unit and the Head of Pharma operations of Europe. She worked for 4 years at Prizm Pharmaceuticals. In 2016, she was recognized as Woman of the Year by the Healthcare Businesswoman's Association.

She has a BA in human biology and a Masters in biology from Stanford University, and an MBA from the Haas School of Business at University of California, Berkeley.

Cook was born and raised in San Francisco. Her father was an attorney, and her older sister, Alison Cook-Sather, is a professor at Bryn Mawr College.

References

Living people
Genentech people
Stanford University alumni
Haas School of Business alumni
Year of birth missing (living people)
Businesspeople from San Francisco